The Airport Line is a tram line of the Manchester Metrolink in Greater Manchester running from Manchester city centre to Manchester Airport via the suburb of Wythenshawe. The line was opened in November 2014 as part of phase three of the system's expansion.

Route

The line runs mostly on reserved track alignments with short sections of street–running. The southern half of the route mostly uses the wide grass verges alongside roads.

The Airport Line proper starts at a junction just south of St Werburgh's Road stop, where the line leaves the former railway trackbed, and runs off to the south-west. It joins Mauldeth Road, running along the central reservation to  stop. It then runs on street along Hardy Lane for a short distance, before crossing onto a tram only viaduct crossing the River Mersey and the Mersey Valley flood plain.

The line then continues on a low embankment to Sale Water Park stop, serving the Sale Water Park; this stop is also near Junction 6 of the M60 motorway and has park and ride facilities. The line then runs  parallel to the M60 for a short distance before turning south-west and crossing it on a tram only bridge.

After crossing the motorway the line serves  stop. Between Northern Moor stop and  stop the line runs on a strip of land which was originally reserved for a road scheme. The line then crosses onto Moor Road, where it serves  stop, before crossing onto a reserved track section alongside the road. A tram bridge takes the tracks over the Mid-Cheshire railway line and into  stop.

The route crosses to another segregated alignment on the south side of Poundswick Lane, crossing the northern end of Rowlandsway before turning left into  stop.

The total distance between St Werburgh's Road and Manchester Airport is 9 miles (14.5 km).

History
The line was opened as part of the third phase of the system's development, which also included new lines to East Didsbury, Ashton-under-Lyne, and Rochdale.

Construction work for all Phase 3b lines began in March 2011. On the Airport Line, a 580-tonne steel bridge was erected in Wythenshawe over the M56 motorway on 25 November 2012. The Airport Line opened on 3 November 2014, more than one year early, and at a cost of £368 million.

Proposed future development

Wythenshawe Loop
The original plans for the line included a loop from Roundthorn tram stop to the existing line at Manchester Airport via Wythenshawe Hospital and Newall Green. Although axed in 2005 to control costs, the Wythenshawe Loop remains an aspiration of TfGM. The route could link with HS2 Manchester Airport High Speed station.

TfGM have submitted a bid for funding to extend the Airport Line to Terminal 2.

Extension to Manchester Airport High Speed station
Plans for the Manchester Airport High Speed station released in 2020 include provision for an east–west tram link. This would see the Airport Line extended to serve the new station.

Services
TfGM have indicated that there could also be a 6-minute service at peak times after 2017.

Usage
During the first full year of operation, 1.88 million journeys were made on the Airport Line.

See also
Styal Line; heavy-rail line also serving Manchester Airport.

References

External links

 LRTA entry on this line
 Map of the line

Manchester Metrolink lines
Transport in Manchester
Manchester Airport
Wythenshawe
2014 establishments in England
Airport rail links in the United Kingdom